Eretmocera bradleyi is a moth of the family Scythrididae. It was described by Hans Georg Amsel in 1961. It is found in the United Arab Emirates and Yemen.

Adults have been recorded on wing in February.

References

bradleyi
Moths described in 1961
Taxa named by Hans Georg Amsel